Jorge Gamboa and Lorena Gamboa are a Spanish couple known for their singing appearances on television programming on different channels: as DayStar, Family Christian Network, Familia TV Network and TBN Enlace. They currently travel the world as Christian evangelists. And are pastoring a church in Houston Texas.

Overview

History
The couple first met at the First Christian Music Contest, Canto de Libertad, in Costa Rica in 1987. At the time, Lorena was a singer in a band called Encuentro and a special education teacher. She was also a student in Cristo al Mundo (Christ for the World) and an active member in the Movimiento Cristiano Juventud Neuva (New Youth Christian Movement). Jorge was a soloist, musician, professional soccer player. They were married on September 17, 1988.

Career
The Gamboas have recorded productions with widely varying styles and subjects. They became known as singers and teachers through the television program de pareja a pareja, as well as through TBN Enlace, at time called La Voz de la Cuadra (The Voice Around the Block). Today they are the founders of Familia TV Network, based in Houston Texas.

Evangelism
In 1996 they joined Good News in Bad News Places Ministries and in 1998 they began their own full-time ministry as overseas evangelists preaching the Gospel of Jesus Christ, imparting family seminars and have been in more than 60 countries around the world since they started.  As an extension of their ministry they also belong to the Vida International Bible Institute and work as the Hispanic coordinators.

Current musical performance
The Gamboas participate in local TV programs such as: "de pareja a pareja" at Channel 21.2 FAMILIA TV, Bendicion TV 43.4, Familia TV 27.4, Celebration at Daystar and Diles at International Spanish TBN in Houston, Texas.

Discography

Studio albums

1996: Nosotros
1999: Confio en Ti Senor"
2000: Te Exaltare2005: Meditacion y Adoracion2006: En Tu Presencia2006: Del Corazon de un Adorador2007: Serie Instrumentales2008: Instrumental flauta, piano y sax2009: Borron y cuenta NuevaBooksMarriage According to GodPractical EvangelismReligions and CultsBy the Power of His PresenceDiscipline, Correction and PunishmentFree from BondageFree to Worship HimDeliveranceCourtship and DatingVale la PenaPor el Poder de Su PresenciaComo ser un Jose de este sigloEl Matrimonio segun DiosCiclos, etapas y estaciones del matrimonio''
"Disciplina, Correccion y Castigo"
"Como Cultivar su relacion Matrimonial"
"Sexo e Intimidad en el Matrimonio"
"Mujeres, eso no fue lo que dijo Pablo"

References

External links
Official website
Jorge y Lorena Ministry Site
Jorge y Lorena Missionary Training Center
Jorge y Lorena on myspace
Jorge y Lorena on tangle.com

Married couples
Spanish evangelicals
Spanish musical duos
Male–female musical duos